Ziziphus oenopolia, commonly known as the jackal jujube, small-fruited jujube or wild jujube, is a flowering plant with a broad distribution through tropical and subtropical Asia and Australasia. In India, it is mostly found in the deciduous forests of the southern part of the country.

Description
It is a spreading, sometimes climbing, thorny shrub growing to 1.5 m in height. The leaves are simple, alternate, ovate-lanceolate, acute and oblique. The flowers are green, in subsessile axillary cymes. The fruit is a globose drupe, black and shiny when ripe, containing a single seed.

Distribution and habitat
It ranges from the Indian subcontinent through southern China and Southeast Asia to northern Australia. It grows along roadside forests and thickets.

Uses
The berries are edible and the bark is used for tanning.

Medicinal
The plant produces cyclopeptide alkaloids known as ziziphines and has a long history of use as an herbal medicine. In India, the root is used in Ayurvedic medicine. The Konkani people of Maharashtra use the chewed leaves as a dressing for wounds. In Burma the stem bark is used as a mouthwash for sore throats, for dysentery, and for inflammation of the uterus.  Research in Thailand has found that extracts of ziziphine from Ziziphus oenopolia show antiplasmodial in vitro activity against the malarial parasite Plasmodium falciparum.

References

Sources

oenopolia
Flora of tropical Asia
Flora of China
Rosales of Australia
Flora of Queensland
Flora of the Northern Territory
Medicinal plants of Asia
Medicinal plants of Oceania
Plants described in 1753
Taxa named by Carl Linnaeus
Taxa named by Philip Miller